M/V Robert W. is a tugboat that was built by the Russel Brothers Ltd. shipbuilding company in Owen Sound, Ontario, in 1948.  The tug is 60 feet long, 16 feet wide, 8 feet 4 inches in depth, and of 48.5 gross tons. It was originally powered by two Cummins NHMS 6-cylinder marine diesel engines originally producing 175 hp each but has been repowered with 2 cummins model NT380M marine engines producing approximately 400 BHP each; the tug originally had a Sheppard 32-volt DC diesel generator for auxiliary power but has been replaced in the mid-1990s with a Lister Diesel model ST2 2-cylinder air-cooled diesel 120-volt AC generator. It was built in 1948 for the Long Lac Pulp & Paper Co. Ltd in Toronto, Ontario, until purchased by Thunder Bay Marine Services in Thunder Bay, Ontario, in 1990.
In 2 locations on the Robert W. there are factory brass plaques that state the vessel is boat number 791, length is 60 feet, beam is 16 feet, and year 1948.

See also

References

1948 ships
Ships built in Ontario
Tugboats of Canada
Tugboats on the Great Lakes